Al Jandal Sport Club is a Saudi football club based in Dumat al-Jandal, Saudi Arabia. They currently play in the Saudi Second Division.

Current squad

References

External links
 Al Jandal Club at Kooora.com

Jandal
1976 establishments in Saudi Arabia
Association football clubs established in 1976
Football clubs in Dumat al-Jandal